USS Luna (AKS-7) was a Liberty ship built in the United States during World War II. She was originally named for Harriet Hosmer, a neoclassical sculptor, considered the first female professional sculptor. She was responsible for delivering and disbursing goods and equipment to locations in the war zone.

Construction
Harriet Hosmer was laid down 23 April 1943, under a Maritime Commission (MARCOM) contract, MC hull 1528, by J.A. Jones Construction, Panama City, Florida; she was launched 30 September 1943.

Service history
Harriet Hosmer was allocated to the Standard Fruit & Steamship Company, on 25 October 1943, for transport to Tampa, Florida. Acquired by the Navy, 2 November 1943, she was converted by Tampa Shipbuilding Co.; renamed Luna 13 November 1943; and commissioned 31 January 1944.

Luna departed Norfolk, Virginia, 19 March 1944, passed through the Panama Canal, and arrived Pearl Harbor 15 April. After being assigned to ServRon 10, she sailed for her first issue area 19 April, and arrived Majuro Atoll, Marshall Islands, 27 April, to service units of the U.S. 5th Fleet. After a short voyage to Kwajalein, she proceeded to Eniwetok 3 June, and returned Pearl Harbor 8 July. She then steamed to Oakland, California, the 6th to reload at the Naval Supply Depot; this was to be her only return to the United States until after the war.

From 1944 to 1946, the ship continued servicing the U.S. 3rd Fleet and the U.S. 5th Fleet in the South Pacific. While at Ulithi, Caroline Islands, 24 October 1945, she assisted  who had struck a mine. After successfully completing seven issuing voyages and servicing 1,121 different ships, Luna was ordered to Tokyo Bay 25 September 1945, to load for the final voyage home.

Post-war decommissioning 

She arrived San Francisco, California, 28 December, and returned to Pearl Harbor, where she was decommissioned 28 April 1946. She was then towed back to San Francisco, and delivered back to MARCOM on 21 May 1947, and laid up in the National Defense Reserve Fleet, in the Suisun Bay Group. On 23 October 1964, she was sold, along with another ship, for $111,226 to Nicolai Joffe Corp., for scrapping. She was removed from the fleet on 2 November 1964.

Military awards and honors 

Lunas crew was eligible for the following medals:
 American Campaign Medal
 Asiatic-Pacific Campaign Medal
 World War II Victory Medal
 Navy Occupation Service Medal (with Asia clasp)

References

Bibliography

External links 
 NavSource Online: Service Ship Photo Archive - AKS-7 Luna

 

Liberty ships
Acubens-class general stores issue ships
Ships built in Panama City, Florida
1943 ships
World War II auxiliary ships of the United States
Suisun Bay Reserve Fleet